Hassan Qraytim (1919 – 21 March 1985 in Beirut) was a Lebanese politician. As of 1960 he was the general secretary of the Lebanese Communist Party. In that year, he participated in the International Meeting of Communist and Workers Parties.

Personal life
He married Salma Al-Bunni and had three children.

References

1919 births
1985 deaths
People from Beirut
Lebanese Communist Party politicians